The Black Wall Street Records was a record label founded by Jayceon "Game" Taylor and George "Big Fase 100" Taylor III.

History
The name "The Black Wall Street" is adopted from what was the racially segregated Greenwood neighborhood of Tulsa, Oklahoma. During the oil boom of the 1920s, Greenwood was home to several successful and prominent African-American entrepreneurs.

Before The Documentary, Game dropped a series of mixtapes on his own label, The Black Wall Street. After leaving G-Unit Records, Game hoped to push The Black Wall Street to the mainstream to compete with his former label and labelmates. Big Fase 100 eventually left the label officially after internal problems with Game. Though the company hasn't released an official retail album, it has released several mixtapes including the "Black Wall Street Journal" and "BWS Radio" series. Former artists who have been on the label include: Eastwood, Techniec, Cyssero, Vita, Ya Boy, and Charli Baltimore.

Artists
As confirmed by wearebws.com.

DJs & producers
Ervin 'EP' Pope – Los Angeles producer EP Pope signed a production deal to Black Wall Street in 2008. He has produced tracks on Doctor's Advocate, Game's third album LAX (album) and In My Own Words he is also known for playing the piano/keyboard on a large portion of Kanye West's The College Dropout and various other production credits on albums such as Diddy's Press Play and Common's Finding Forever.
DJ Skee – The Black Wall Street's DJ, Skee has worked on every mixtape for Black Wall Street since You Know What It Is Vol. 3 came out. He has hosted the Envy Expo at the Los Angeles Convention Center and done mixtapes for outside artists too, such as Omar Cruz, Bishop Lamont and small upcoming artists. DJ Skee has a radio show on Power 106 with DJ Reflex.
Tre Beatz
DJ Kris-Stylez – Kris-Stylez is the official show/tour DJ for Game.\

References

External links
The Game
We Are BWS
Thisizgame.com

Record labels established in 2004
American record labels
Hip hop record labels
Vanity record labels
Labels distributed by Universal Music Group
Gangsta rap record labels